Klondike Independent School District is a public school district located in southwestern Dawson County, Texas (USA). The district also serves most of northern Martin County.

In 2009, the school district was rated "recognized" by the Texas Education Agency. In 2010, Klondike ISD was recognized as an Exemplary District by the Texas Education Agency.

Special programs

Athletics
Klondike High School plays six-man football.

References

External links
Klondike ISD

School districts in Dawson County, Texas
School districts in Martin County, Texas